Acer Records is an independent record label, based in Hazel Grove, Greater Manchester, England, United Kingdom.

Originally named after Tim Scott's private studio facility – Acer Studios, it was set up initially in 2002 for the recording and release in 2003 of his debut album Bald on the Inside, and as a front to administer the publishing rights and distribution of his solo compositions.

Bald on the Inside was distributed through Borders Books & Music Stores throughout the UK.  Backed by a UK-wide in store CD signing tour, it generated enough sales to put it occasionally inside their top 200 sellers list.

The name was changed to Acer Records in order to separate the label and the underlying core company in 2008 with the release of Tim Scott's second album Guitar Mashing 

The grouped release of the Amy Jane, Angel Dust and  4:AM singles and the digital release of Bald on the Inside all in November 2009, were all encompassed under the Acer Records umbrella.

Roster
Tim Scott

Discography

Studio albums

EPs

Singles

References

External links
 

Record labels established in 2003
British independent record labels
Pop record labels
Rock record labels
Vanity record labels